WXKC (99.9 MHz) branded as Classy 100 is a commercial FM radio station in Erie, Pennsylvania. It is owned by Cumulus Media and broadcasts an adult contemporary radio format, switching to Christmas music for much of November and December. 

WXKC's studios are located at 471 Robison Rd West in Erie, while its transmitter is located near Knoyle Rd and Heibel Rd outside of Erie. WXKC broadcasts using HD Radio technology.  Its HD2 digital subchannel airs a Classic Hip Hop format called "104.3 The Vibe".  The HD2 signal feeds FM translator W282BR at 104.3 MHz.

History

Beginnings
The station first went on the air in 1949 as WERC-FM, the FM counterpart to WERC (1260 AM), becoming WWYN-FM in 1960 and WWFM in 1966. The call sign was changed to WLVU in 1975.

For many years until the mid-1980s, this was Erie's heritage easy listening radio station. The station ran automated for almost its entire existence until its purchase by K & K Radio Broadcasting station on April 1, 1985, when it was changed to an AC oldies station "Easy Rock 999", which operated for several months on the automation system.

Following the purchase by K & K, and amid declines in the easy listening format, Don Kelly took Eazy Rock 999 live to Classy 100 WXKC adult contemporary on June 15, 1985, much like what it is today.

The original announcing staff when Classy 100 launched in the Spring of 1985 was: Morning Drive/Program Director-Dana Bolles, Mid-Days-Paul Davies, Afternoon Drive/Promotions Director-Joe DeSantis, Love Songs 7-Midnight-Kristi Nelson. One year after launch the station, with this crew, was selected as Medium Market Station of the Year runner up.

The original Sales Team members: Carolyn Buckel, Don Dalesio, Don Alberstadt, Paul Wickles and General Sales Manager Gary Spurgeon.

On-air personalities
 Brenda Savelli
 Cassiday
 Heather Perry
Kid Kelly
Jim Brickham
Delilah
 John Tesh

References

External links
 
 104.3 The Vibe

 
 

XKC
Cumulus Media radio stations
Radio stations established in 1949
1949 establishments in Pennsylvania